Erber Alfredo Burgos Ángel (born 8 April 1969) is a retired Salvadoran football player.

Club career
Burgos had a lengthy spell with local giants FAS, before moving to Águila and later to San Salvador F.C., Topiltzín and Dragón. He retired at Second Division Alba-Acajutla in 2009.

International career
Burgos made his debut for El Salvador in a December 1995 UNCAF Nations Cup match against Costa Rica and has earned a total of 22 caps, scoring no goals. He has represented his country in 4 FIFA World Cup qualification matches  and played at the 2001 and 2005 UNCAF Cups.

His final international was a July 2000 friendly match against Mexico.

References

External links

 Profile - El Gráfico 

1969 births
Living people
People from La Libertad Department (El Salvador)
Association football midfielders
Salvadoran footballers
El Salvador international footballers
C.D. FAS footballers
C.D. Águila footballers
San Salvador F.C. footballers
1996 CONCACAF Gold Cup players